{{DISPLAYTITLE:Epsilon1 Arae}}

Epsilon1 Arae (ε1 Ara, ε1 Arae) is the Bayer designation for a star in the constellation Ara, the Altar. It is visible to the naked eye with an apparent visual magnitude of +4.1 Based upon an annual parallax shift of 9.04 mas, this star is around  distant from the Earth.

ε1 Arae is an evolved giant star with a stellar classification of K3 III. It is around 74% more massive than the Sun. At an age of about 1.7 billion years, the outer envelope of the star has expanded to almost 34 times the Sun's radius. It is radiating energy into space at an effective temperature of 4,176 K, giving it the orange-hued glow of a K-type star.

ε1 Arae was known as (spelled as "Guī yī", meaning: "the 1st (star) of ") in traditional Chinese astronomy.  
Allen erroneously called it Tso Kang. He probably confused the constellation "Ara" with "Ari", as Tso Kang is actually in Aries.

References

Further reading 
  (1987): , pp. 312, 326.

External links 
 Simbad Epsilon1 Arae
 Image Epsilon1 Arae
 AEEA (Activities of Exhibition and Education in Astronomy) 天文教育資訊網 2006 年 7 月 1 日

Guī yī
152980
Arae, Epsilon1
Ara (constellation)
K-type giants
085153
6295
Durchmusterung objects